Ochthephilum fracticorne is a species of rove beetle in the family Staphylinidae.

References

External links

 

Paederinae
Beetles described in 1800